Sýn is a mass media company in Iceland, which operates Vodafone Iceland, Vísir.is and several TV and radio stations, including Stöð 2, Stöð 2 Sport, Bylgjan and FM 957. It also rebroadcasts foreign television channels over its digital TV system. In 2017, it bought most of 365 Miðlar assets.

Telecommunications
Vodafone Iceland

Television
Stöð 2
Stöð 2 Bíó
Stöð 2 eSport
Stöð 2 Fjölskylda
Stöð 2 Golf
Stöð 2 Sport
Stöð 2 Sport 2
Stöð 2 Sport 3
Stöð 2 Sport 5
Stöð 2 Sport 6
Stöð 2 Vísir
Tónlist

Radio
Bylgjan
Létt Bylgjan - 96.7 (previously: Létt 96.7)
Gull Bylgjan - 90.9
80s Bylgjan (internet radio)
X-ið 977 - 97.7
FM 957   - 95.7
FM Extra - 101.5
Apparatið  (internet radio)

Webmedia
Vísir.is
Stod2.is
Bylgjan.is
Xið977.is
FM957.is

References

External links

Official website

Mass media companies of Iceland
Companies based in Reykjavík
Icelandic brands